Trollrunor in Swedish and Trollruner in Norwegian (in English Magical Runes; this series has not been translated into English) is a historical series of novels, written by Norwegian-Swedish author Margit Sandemo. The main body of this series of novels takes place in Österlen, Sweden in the end of Middle Ages. Main characters of Trollrunor are a young girl named Iliana and her partner Ravn, who is a younger son of evil lord Bogislav. Their enemy is the malicious Moon Witch. First part of this set of books came out 2005, and it has been published in Swedish and Norwegian. Trollrunor includes eleven books, and nine of them have been published until this date. The eleventh book will be published 26 November 2007 in Norway and a few weeks later in Sweden.

Titles 

Novel series
Novels by Margit Sandemo
Novels set in Sweden